Norman Leslie Gavin (15 September 1922 – 18 February 2013) was an English first-class cricketer and Royal Air Force (RAF) officer.

Gavin made one appearance in first-class cricket in 1946 for the Royal Air Force cricket team against Worcestershire at Worcester. He took three wickets with his slow left-arm orthodox and scored 52 runs. He played for the Kent Second XI in the Minor Counties Championship from 1947–1949.

References

External links

1922 births
2013 deaths
People from Camberwell
Royal Air Force officers
Royal Air Force personnel of World War II
English cricketers
Royal Air Force cricketers